Irene Maria Duarte Gonçalves (born 11 December 1984) is an Angolan retired footballer who played as a forward. Nicknamed Diva Demolidora (Destroyer Diva) or simply Demolidora (Destroyer), she is the historical top goalscorer of the Angola women's national team, which she has also captained.

Club career
Gonçalves has captained the women's team of Progresso Associação do Sambizanga. During the 2008 Angolan Women's Football League, she scored 22 goals in a single match, which many people consider a world record in women's football, but it is not internationally recognized.

International career
Gonçalves capped for Angola at senior level during the 2002 African Women's Championship and the 2010 African Women's Championship qualification (preliminary round).

International goals
Scores and results list Angola's goal tally first

Retirement
In March 2012, Gonçalves announced her retirement from football.

Personal life
Gonçalves is a Catholic.

References

1984 births
Living people
Footballers from Luanda
Angolan women's footballers
Women's association football forwards
Progresso Associação do Sambizanga players
Angola women's international footballers
Angolan Roman Catholics